The whistling lizard or Sri Lanka agama (Calotes liolepis) is a species of lizard in the family Agamidae. It is one of four Calotes species endemic to Sri Lanka.

Distribution
Restricted to submontane forests below 100m, and found in forested areas and plantations. Widely distributed, but apparently patchily distributed, in the central hills of Sri Lanka, including Knuckles, Kotmale, Sinharaja, Talawakele, Hanguranketha, Kanneliya, Galle, Kandy, Dambulla, Peradeniya, Namunukula, and Gampola.

Description
Head long. Tail long. A series of spines on nape make up the dorso-nuchal crest in males. Enlarged scales on dorsum of the body. Midbody scale rows 33–39. Ventral scales as large as those on flanks. Forehead pale brown, with pale inter-orbital bands. Dorsum pale gray with dark gray bands, numbering four on the body. Limbs and tail similarly dark-banded.

Ecology
Unusual among agamid lizards is its habit of uttering a high-pitched whistle when alarmed. It feeds on insects and ants. Gravid females are seen between July–August.

References
 http://biodiversityofsrilanka.blogspot.com/2013/10/whistling-lizardforest-lizardcalotes.html
 http://reptile-database.reptarium.cz/species?genus=Calotes&species=liolepis
 http://www.wildreach.com/reptile/Sauria/Calotes%20liolepis.php
 https://www.researchgate.net/publication/233971165_Natural_history_and_current_distribution_patterns_of_Calotes_liolepis_Boulenger_1885_(Reptilia_Agamidae_Draconinae)_in_Sri_Lanka

Reptiles of Sri Lanka
Calotes
Reptiles described in 1885
Taxa named by George Albert Boulenger